Pomster is a municipality in the district of Ahrweiler, in Rhineland-Palatinate, Germany. It is located in the Eifel mountain range.

References

Ahrweiler (district)